Tropical Cyclone Kate was a short-lived Category 2 cyclone that remained nearly stationary for its entire existence in the northwestern Coral Sea in February 2006. Forming out of a monsoonal trough on 22 February, Kate rapidly intensified throughout the day. By 23 February, the system attained its peak intensity with winds of 95 km/h (60 mph 10-minute sustained) and a barometric pressure of 985 hPa (mbar). Shortly thereafter, increasing wind shear caused the storm to quickly weaken. By 24 February, the system dissipated over open waters near Queensland, Australia. Although Kate did not directly affect land, large swells produced by the storm impacted beaches in Papua New Guinea and Queensland. The waves injured six people in Australia, although no property damage was reported.

Meteorological history

Cyclone Kate originated from an area of low pressure that was first identified on 22 February 2006, within a monsoonal trough. The system rapidly intensified throughout the day, with the Australian Bureau of Meteorology issuing their first advisory on the system that evening. Upon being classified, the system was immediately declared Tropical Cyclone Kate, skipping tropical low status. At the same time, the Joint Typhoon Warning Center (JTWC) also began issuing advisories on the system, designating it as Tropical Cyclone 13P. The storm had developed well-defined, upper-level outflow enhanced by diffluence over the system.

The system remained nearly stationary over the northwestern Coral Sea. Early on 23 February, the storm attained its peak intensity with winds of 95 km/h (60 mph 10-minute sustained) and a barometric pressure of 985 hPa (mbar). However, the JTWC assessed the system to have been slightly weaker, attaining peak winds of 85 km/h (50 mph 1-minute sustained). Further intensification was anticipated as Kate slowly tracked towards Queensland, Australia. However, Kate stalled shortly thereafter and began to weaken due to increasing wind shear. Rapid weakening took place throughout the day, and JTWC declared the system dissipated early on 24 February. The Bureau of Meteorology downgraded Kate to a tropical low around the same time, although they continued to monitor the storm for several more hours before reporting that it had dissipated over open waters.

Preparations and impact
Although the storm did not pose much of a threat to Queensland, officials urged residents to ensure their disaster kits were ready and that preparations for a moderate storm, such as storing lose outdoor objects and clearing gutters, had been completed.

While the storm had no direct impact on land, large swells affected most of the Queensland coastline. In the Shire of Noosa, six surfers sustained serious injuries after wading into turbulent waters. Waves up to  tossed the six surfers, leaving them with injuries ranging from broken noses and fractured ankles to head wounds from surfboards. The waves also caused additional beach erosion to parts of Papua New Guinea previously impacted by Cyclone Ingrid in March 2005.

See also

2005–06 Australian region cyclone season

References

External links
Australian Bureau of Meteorology (TCWC's Perth, Darwin & Brisbane) 
Joint Typhoon Warning Center (JTWC) 

2005–06 Australian region cyclone season
Category 2 Australian region cyclones
2006 in Australia
Tropical cyclones in Queensland
Kate